Lamoria infumatella is a species of snout moth in the genus Lamoria. It is found in India and Sri Lanka.

References

Moths described in 1898
Tirathabini
Moths of Asia